Nistarini (Women's) College, established on 17 August 1957, is the oldest women's college in Purulia district, West Bengal, India. It offers undergraduate courses in arts and sciences. It is affiliated to Sidho Kanho Birsha University and accredited by National Assessment and Accreditation Council with an A grade. The current principal is Dr. Indrani Deb.

History
This college was established in Purulia to promote women's higher education in Purulia district and its surrounding areas. The idea of establishing this kind of institution is conceptualized in the Summer House of Deshbandhu Chittaranjan Das, a pioneer in India's Freedom Movement. The college started on 17 August 1957 in a rented house called "Swapan Puri" at Ranchi road, Purulia. The foundation stone was laid by then-president of India Dr. Rajendra Prasad and the college shifted to its original abode on 16 April 1958. The founder was Sri. Jimut Bahan Sen (founder president).

Sri Bhuban Mohan Das and Smt. Nistarini Devi, father and mother of Sri Chittaranjan Das, came to reside in this Summer House in 1902. They were dedicated social workers and pioneered in introducing higher education among the women of this place. Amala Devi, their daughter, started a school to impart higher education to the girls of Purulia. At that time there was only one primary school, Nistarini Vidyalaya, and its entire expense was defrayed by Chittaranjan Das. Amala Devi had taken initiative to educate the girls on all fonts. She had also started an orphanage and widow's home under her guidance. But after demise of Sri Bhuban Mohan Das, Smt. Nistarini Devi and Amala Devi in a short span, these institution were temporarily closed.

Later, the then-chief minister of West Bengal, Dr. Bidhan Chandra Roy, took the initiative to revive the institution and made the Summer House the present-day Nistarini Women's College.

Affiliation and accreditation
The college is affiliated to Sidho Kanho Birsha University and recognized by the University Grants Commission (UGC). It was accredited by the National Assessment and Accreditation Council (NAAC) and awarded an A grade in 2016.

Departments

Science

Chemistry
Physics
Mathematics
Botany
Zoology
Nutrition
Computer Science
Environmental Science

Arts
Education
Bengali
English
Sanskrit
Hindi
History
Geography
Political Science
Philosophy
Economics
Physical Education
Music

See also

References

External links
Nistarini Women's College
Sidho Kanho Birsha University
University Grants Commission
National Assessment and Accreditation Council

Colleges affiliated to Sidho Kanho Birsha University
Educational institutions established in 1957
Academic institutions formerly affiliated with the University of Burdwan
Women's universities and colleges in West Bengal
Universities and colleges in Purulia district
1957 establishments in West Bengal